The Agrodome in Rotorua is a major tourist attraction in New Zealand. The farm theme park, majority-owned by Christchurch-based Ngāi Tahu Tourism, was founded in 1971.

History
The Agrodome was set up in 1971 by Godfrey Bowen and George Harford as a farm theme park. Bowen was a world championship sheep shearer with a large international reputation and Harford was a local farmer. The venture was part-funded by the government as a tourism initiative. Bowen's brother Ivan, also an expert shearer, was the Agrodome's chief showman.

Attractions and activities
In 2016, the Agrodome management bought a trio of Clydesdale horses that had been a tourist attraction in the Auckland suburb of Devonport and that had acting roles in The Hobbit and Xena: Warrior Princess. Since 2018, the Agrodome holds Valais Blacknose sheep, which are new to the country. The purchase brought the number of sheep species at the Agrodome to 26.

The annual Rotorua A&P (agricultural and pastoral) Show is held at the Agrodome. The 2016 secondary schools cross country championships were held at the Agrodome.

There are three farm shows held per day lasting one hour each. Components include sheep shearing, learning about farm animals. The show, which is both educational and entertaining, is popular with tourists and locals alike.

Ownership
The Agrodome was owned by the Bowen and Hartford families. In 2006, the families bought the Lakeland Queen from receivers; the ship is used as a restaurant and for cruises on Lake Rotorua. In 2011, Ngāi Tahu Tourism was brought in as a business partner with experience in the tourism market, with the iwi obtaining a 75% shareholding.

References

Entertainment companies of New Zealand
Agriculture companies of New Zealand
Travel and holiday companies of New Zealand
Tourist attractions in Rotorua
Agriculture companies established in 1971
New Zealand companies established in 1971